Glen Waverley railway station is the terminus of the suburban electrified Glen Waverley line in Victoria, Australia. It serves the south-eastern Melbourne suburb of Glen Waverley, and opened on 5 May 1930.

History
Glen Waverley station opened on 5 May 1930, when the railway line was extended from East Malvern. Like the suburb itself, the station was named after a township which was privately surveyed in 1853. The owner named it after Sir Walter Scott's novel Waverley.

The original station was built adjacent to Springvale Road, until it was relocated west to its current location in 1964. The old station building was relocated to Epping, which became the terminus of the Epping line in November of that year. Also in that year, the line between Syndal and Glen Waverley was duplicated.

Directly opposite Platform 2 are three stabling roads. On 23 June 1979, a fire destroyed Tait motor carriage 339M whilst stabled in No. 4 road. The fire also damaged trailer carriage 407T and two stabled Hitachi sets.

On 16 August 1995, Glen Waverley was upgraded to a Premium Station.

In 2012, construction of the "Ikon" apartment complex began on the station site, as part of VicTrack's station precinct enhancement program. The $70 million development was completed in 2013, with the proceeds being used to fund a $1.8 million upgrade to the station forecourt. Works were completed in mid 2014.

Facilities, platforms and services
Glen Waverley has one island platform with two faces. The station building features a customer service window, two semi-enclosed waiting areas and toilets.

It is served by Glen Waverley line trains.

Platform 1:
  services to and from Flinders Street

Platform 2:
  services to and from Flinders Street

Transport links
Located north of the station, on Railway Parade North, is a twelve bay bus terminus which serves eleven bus routes, operated by CDC Melbourne, Kinetic Melbourne and Ventura Bus Lines. All bus routes are under contract to Public Transport Victoria.

Departure bays

Bay 1
 : to St Kilda (operated by CDC Melbourne)

Bay 2
 : to Dandenong station (operated by Ventura Bus Lines)
 : to Springvale station (operated by Ventura Bus Lines)

Bay 3
  : to Westfield Airport West (operated by Kinetic Melbourne)

Bay 4
  : to Chelsea station
  : to Croydon station (Saturday and Sunday mornings only, operated by Ventura Bus Lines)

Bay 5
 : to Rowville (operated by Ventura Bus Lines)

Bay 7
 : to Croydon station (operated by Ventura Bus Lines)
 : to Monash University Clayton Campus

Bay 8
 : to Chadstone Shopping Centre (operated by Ventura Bus Lines)

Bay 9
 : to Ringwood station

Bay 10
 : to Bayswater station (operated by Ventura Bus Lines)

Bay 11
 : to Mitcham station (operated by Ventura Bus Lines)
 : to Blackburn station

Bay 12
 : to Glen Iris station (operated by Ventura Bus Lines)

References

External links
 
 Melway map at street-directory.com.au

Premium Melbourne railway stations
Railway stations in Melbourne
Railway stations in Australia opened in 1930
Glen Waverley, Victoria
Railway stations in the City of Monash